Mary Sully (1896–1963) was a Yankton Dakota avant-garde artist. Her work was largely unknown until the early 21st century. 

Sully is best known today for colored-pencil triptychs and "personality portraits" which often depicted celebrities such as Amelia Earhart, Gertrude Stein, and Greta Garbo. Using abstract forms and symbols coupled with rich and mesmerizing colors and symmetry, many of her panels appear like a kaleidoscope. Her designs draw from and incorporate classic Native American designs — specifically Navajo textiles or Plains parfleches, painted rawhide containers — while also aligning with the Art Nouveau and Bauhaus movements. Although she was active in the early decades of the 20th century when Native American art and Art Nouveau were making a parallel climb into mainstream fine art exhibitions, Sully was considered revolutionary in marrying these two genres.

Biography 
Susan Mable Deloria was born to father Tipi Sapa (Black Lodge), or Philip J. Deloria, and mother Mary Sully. She is the great-granddaughter of 19th century American portrait artist Thomas Sully, from whom she took her name. Her sister, Ella Cara Deloria, was an anthropologist with whom she traveled extensively throughout the United States, visiting many Native communities and observing the art that was a part of their daily lives. She also spent much of her time in New York City, taking inspiration from the thriving art scene there. 

Sully was raised in the Episcopal faith as her father was a minister. Her familiarity and experience with religion is depicted in several of her works. Sully died on August 29, 1963 in Omaha, Nebraska.

Artwork 
Sully worked largely in triptychs, three-paneled pieces. Some of these triptychs were "Personality portraits" of celebrities or other public figures, animating the personality of the individual whom they depict through the use of abstract symbolism and a continuous color palette that creates cohesiveness among the three panels. Kagawa is an example of one such portrait, which portrays Toyohiko Kagawa; a Japanese social reformer and Christian missionary. A large purple cross is depicted in the first panel, and the design surrounding it suggests movement and dimension. The second (center) panel is a kaleidoscopic reformation of the first, and appears as though elements of the first panel have been zoomed in to focus on, and arranged in a symmetrical pattern involving three rows of seven oval shapes amid sharp angles. The third panel recalls designs from the first and second, such as crosses and circles, but in a traditional Navajo style; a type of design often seen in Navajo textiles or Plains beadwork. It can be surmised that Sully quite intentionally incorporated customary Navajo design elements with Christian imagery. Curator Jill Ahlberg Yohe says of Sully's symbology: "Christianity was imposed on Dakota and Lakota people, so a lot of traditional practices were banned, but if you could superimpose them on Christianity, you could subvert that system and still maintain a lot of traditional practices". This can also be recognized in Sully's triptych, "The Indian Church".

In 2019, Sully's great-nephew, Philip J. Deloria, published a book exploring Sully's life and art, Becoming Mary Sully: Toward an American Indian Abstract. Three of Sully's artworks were selected for inclusion in the art show “Hearts of Our People: Native Women Artists,” at Minneapolis Institute of Art.

References 

1896 births
1963 deaths
Native American women artists
Native American Episcopalians
20th-century American women artists
American portrait painters
20th-century American painters
American women painters
Yankton Dakota people
Artists from South Dakota